Aznar (or Asnar) Sánchez (Gascon: Aznar Sans) (died 836) was the Duke of Gascony from 820. He was the supposed son of Sancho I of Gascony, though he has been identified with Aznar Galíndez I, Count of Aragon.

In 824, according to the Vita Hludowici, the counts Aznar and Aeblus (Eblus atque Asenarius committees) led an army against rebellious Pamplona. According to the Annales regni Francorum of Einhard, they (Aeblus et Asinarius comites) brought a great deal of wealth with them. They were defeated in a "second Roncesvalles" and Pamplona gained its independence while the two counts were captured. Aznar, however, being a relative (consanguineus) of his captors, according to Astronomus, was released.

Aznar fell out with Berengar's successor in the March of Gothia, Bernard of Septimania. In 828, Gascony revolted again. In 836, Aznar was killed (a horrible death).

Notes

Sources

836 deaths
dukes of Gascony
year of birth unknown